Mathies "Matt" Parrott (May 11, 1837 – April 21, 1900) was an American politician and businessman.

Born in Schoharie County, New York, Parrott moved to Iowa and was in the newspaper and printing business. He served in the Iowa State Senate and was Lieutenant Governor of Iowa. He died in Battle Creek, Michigan.

Notes

1837 births
1900 deaths
People from Schoharie County, New York
Iowa state senators
Lieutenant Governors of Iowa
19th-century American politicians